Fjære Church  is a parish church of the Church of Norway in Grimstad Municipality in Agder county, Norway. It is located in the village of Fjære. It is the main church for the Fjære parish which is part of the Vest-Nedenes prosti (deanery) in the Diocese of Agder og Telemark. The white, stone church was built in a long church design around the year 1150 using plans drawn up by an unknown architect. The church seats about 300 people.

History
The earliest existing historical records of the church date back to the year 1320, but the church was not new that year. The first church at Fjære was likely a wooden church with a stone altar. That church was taken down at some point an replaced with the present church, likely around the year 1150, but the old stone altar from the old church was left in place and a new stone church was constructed on the same site surrounding the existing altar. The new church had a  rectangular nave with an  rectangular choir on the east end. There was a semi-circular apse built on the eastern end of the choir as well. The church was constructed with a basement crypt underneath it. (The crypt contains 26 bodies, mainly important people from the community during the 17th century. The basement was formally closed to visitors in 1997 to give respect to the dead.)

The church was essentially the same from the early 1300s until the 1600s when changes were undertaken. First, the roof structure was changed, and the church got a flat ceiling and a new attic floor. Since then, the number of seats has been increased by adding balcony seating areas. During the 18th century, the apse had settlement damage, and the roof there was torn down and the apse was rebuilt along with a wooden sacristy on the east side of it. Around 1745 the gallery along the north wall was extended to the choir. In 1827, a large wooden tower was built on the west end of the building. In 1898, the west gallery was expanded to accommodate the organ. In the 1930s, plans were made to renovate and restore the old church. These got interrupted by the German invasion of Norway and the ensuing period of war. The restoration was finished during the 1950s and 1960s. When it was all finished, they had removed the old sacristy in the east and a larger sacristy was built on the north side of the nave. The foundations were all fixed to correct the sagging and skewed walls within the building. Frescoes were uncovered on the walls at this time as well.

29th of October 2021, the church was broken into and vandalised. Amongst other things, the offenders had entered into the 17th century crypt and damaged various artifacts such as the 13th century baptismal font.

Terje Vigen
The local poet and writer, Henrik Ibsen, wrote a poem about Terje Vigen in 1861. The poem talks about Fjære Church where Terje Vigen is buried. There is a large obelisk in the churchyard remembering Vigen and others who died during that war in 1807–1809.

Media gallery

See also
List of churches in Agder og Telemark

References

Grimstad
Churches in Agder
Stone churches in Norway
12th-century churches in Norway
Churches completed in 1150
12th-century establishments in Norway